Hulikatti is a village in Belagavi district in the southern state of Karnataka, India.

References

Villages in Belagavi district